The Columbia Pike–Pentagon City Line, designated as Routes 16G & 16H, are daily bus routes operated by the Washington Metropolitan Area Transit Authority between the neighborhoods of Arlington Mill (16G) or Skyline City (16H) and Pentagon City station of the Yellow and Blue lines of the Washington Metro. This line is part of the Pike Ride service, which runs through Columbia Pike. This line provides service through the neighborhoods of Fairfax County and Arlington County to Pentagon City. Unlike the Columbia Pike Line, the Columbia Pike–Pentagon City Line does not serve Columbia Pike past the Arlington County line.

Route description and service

The 16G and 16H operate daily from Four Mile Run Division. Route 16G operates between the neighborhood of Arlington Mill and Pentagon City station, providing local stops through Columbia Pike. The 16G also runs through other neighborhoods in Columbia Pike, such as Barcroft, Arlington Heights, and Penrose. Route 16H operates between Skyline City and Pentagon City station. The 16H serves a portion of Leesburg Pike to expand service to the marketplace of Skyline City.

History

The line was part of the Pike Ride route since September 7, 2003. During the creation of the Pike Ride Transit Service, this line was formally known as the Columbia Heights West–Pentagon City Line.

Columbia Heights West–Pentagon City Line

Routes 16G, 16H, 16K, and 16W are the initial routes of the line. These routes runs between Pentagon City Station and the neighborhood of Arlington Mill. Although WMATA recognized the neighborhood as Columbia Heights West, instead of Arlington Mill. Route 16G operated daily, while Routes 16H and 16W operated during peak hours, and Route 16K operates during the weekend. Route 16K does not serve Pentagon City Station, but serves Pentagon station instead. This line replaced routes 16S, 16U, and 16X from the Shirlington–Pentagon Line, while 16W continued to run. Route 16G was initially part of the Columbia Pike Line, until 2003 when it was rerouted as part of the Pike Ride project. Route 16H operates between the neighborhood of Barcroft, and Pentagon City station. Route 16H brings local stops west of the neighborhood of Penrose, where the 16Y serves. Route 16W serves up to Skyline City, via South Four Mile Run Drive and South George Mason Drive.

In 2005, route 16H was extended to run between Crystal City Station and Bailey's Crossroads. The Four Mile Run segment was discontinued, and route 16W continues to serve Skyline City via South George Mason Drive. Route 16W was fully discontinued in 2010, as the route was taken over from route 16H in 2010. The Crystal City Segment was permanently discontinued from the line, when Metroway, WMATA's bus rapid transit, extended to Pentagon City in 2016.

The line was renamed to Columbia Pike–Pentagon City Line in 2018, after confusion with the neighborhood of Columbia Heights West, as there is the neighborhood of Columbia Heights in Washington D.C., along with Columbia Heights Station that serves the Yellow and Green lines of the Washington Metro. Since the 16G, and 16H does not go to Washington D.C., the 16G westbound was renamed to Arlington Mill, the actual name of the neighborhood of Arlington County.

September 2005 changes

Route 16H extended to Crystal City station and Bailey's Crossroads on September 25, 2005. The Four Mile Run segment was discontinued, and route 16W is rerouted to South George Mason Drive. The 16H continues to operate via Pentagon City Station.

2010 Proposed Changes

In 2010 during WMATA's FY2011 budget, WMATA proposed to reconstruct the line.

Route 16G was proposed to extend to Pentagon station via Pentagon City station during weekday off-peak hours and Saturdays. Sunday 16G service was also proposed to be discontinued and to be replaced by the 16E and the 16P.

Route 16H was proposed in two options. The first option was to extend to Skyline City via Jefferson Street, Leesburg Pike and George Mason Drive to Seminary Road. The second option was to extend to Northern Virginia Community College (Alexandria Campus) via Jefferson Street and Leesburg Pike. If extended to NOVA Alexandria campus, the 16H will terminate at Dawes Avenue. From either both options, the 16H is also proposed to discontinue service between Pentagon City station and Crystal City station.

Routes 16W was proposed to be converted to the 16H, depending on one of the two options. Alternate service is provided by the 22A from the Barcroft–South Fairlington Line towards South George Mason Drive and South Four Mile Run Drive, and Arlington Transit route 75 towards South Frederick Street and South George Mason Drive.

December 2010 changes

Route 16W was fully discontinued from service on December 29, 2010. Route 16H was extended to Skyline City from Bailey's Crossroads, taking over the 16W Route.

2016 Proposed Changes

In 2016 during WMATA's FY2018 budget, it was proposed to convert route 16G and 16K to route 16H to reduce costs, and to reduce redundancy to Arlington Transit routes. According to performance measure it goes as the following for WMATA:

April 2016 changes

As the Metroway Bus Rapid Transit service continues to progress in Arlington, the 16H service between Pentagon City & Crystal City was discontinued. Route 16H stopped serving Crystal City on March 27, 2016, and truncated back to Pentagon City, where it originally ran.

June 2018 changes

The Columbia Pike–Pentagon City Line began to modify service, by simplifying routes into different portions. Route 16K which served between the neighborhood of Arlington Mill and Pentagon Station was discontinued on June 24, 2018. Route 16G continued to operate through the neighborhood of Arlington Mill, alongside Arlington Transit routes 41, 45, and 75. Along with these changes, Route 16H began operating on weekends.

2020 Proposed Changes
During WMATAs 2021 Fiscal Year budget, it was proposed to consolidate both route 16G and 16H into one route with the 16G being replaced by 16H, and  Arlington Transit routes 41, 45 and 75 as part of Arlington County countywide transit development plan. However WMATA later backed out the merger of the 16G and the 16H on April 2, 2020, retaining both routes as separate routes.

References 

2003 establishments in Virginia
Transport infrastructure completed in 2003
16G